Atheists, Reconsider is a split EP between two Brooklyn groups: Oneida and Liars. Each band contributes two original songs, plus one cover of a composition by the other band. The album art was designed by Karl LaRocca/Kayrock Screenprinting.

Track listing
 "Rose and Licorice" - Liars
 "Privilege" - Oneida
 "All in All a Careful Party" - Liars
 "Fantastic Morgue" - Oneida
 "Every Day Is a Child with Teeth" - Oneida
 "Dorothy Taps the Toe of the Tinman" - Liars

References

2002 EPs
Liars (band) albums
Oneida (band) albums
Arena Rock Recording Company EPs
Split EPs